Bravo Airlines was an airline based in Madrid, Spain. Its main base was Madrid Barajas International Airport.

History

Destinations

Fleet
The Bravo Airlines fleet included the following aircraft (as of 21 September 2008): 
 1 Boeing 767-200ER (which was operated for Air Ivoire)

See also
List of defunct airlines of Spain

References

External links

Bravo Airlines
Bravo Airlines Fleet

Defunct airlines of Spain
Airlines established in 2004
Defunct cargo airlines
Cargo airlines of Spain